Revel is a dockless electric moped sharing startup based in New York City. Founded in 2018 by Frank Reig and Paul Suhey, it first started with a small pilot program in New York, later growing its fleet size in New York and expanding into Washington, D.C.

History
Revel was founded in 2018 by Frank Reig who serves as CEO and Paul Suhey who serves as COO. In July 2018 it started with a 10-month pilot in the New York City boroughs of Brooklyn and Queens with 68 scooters, eventually replacing them with 1,000 new scooters in the space of one week in May 2019.

On August 16, 2019, Revel expanded to Washington, D.C. with a pilot program of 400 mopeds compared with a total of 5,600 other bikes and scooters from other sharing companies. Their first crash was reported the same weekend.

As of June 2019, Revel has about 40 employees in New York, all full-time with insurance and benefits. In Washington they employ a further 30 employees. The mopeds it uses are not owned by the company; rather, outside companies buy the mopeds and lease them to Revel.

In February 2021, Revel expanded its product line by offering monthly electric bike subscriptions to residents of Manhattan, Brooklyn, Queens and the Bronx. As of early April 2021, Revel also operates in Miami, Florida, and in the city of San Francisco, California, after exiting nearby Oakland and Berkeley in 2021.

Vehicles

Revel's mopeds are manufactured by a Chinese company called NIU and sell for between $3000 and $5000 retail. The batteries are replaced by Revel employees when they need to be recharged. They are equipped with two helmets which Revel says are cleaned every two or three days. All Revel mopeds are registered with the DMV and have license plates.

Driving requirements
Drivers must be 18 or older, have a valid license, and pay a $5 fee for the verification. The company provides a free half-hour rider instructor course but has faced criticisms for its untrained riders and the small number of available lessons compared to the number of new riders. The mopeds are driven and parked on the street, unlike other scooter or bike-sharing companies whose bikes take up space on the sidewalks. Revel does not permit its mopeds for use on major highways and bridges.

Safety incidents and legal challenges
Revel Transit's first personal injury lawsuit came in July 2019 after a driver hit a biker, severely breaking the biker's ankle which required surgery. Police claim the biker pulled in front of the Revel driver who was turning left, causing a collision. The biker's lawyer, however, states that police did not take a statement from his client and it was the Revel driver who collided with the biker as he was attempting a left turn. The suit claims that Revel is liable for "failure to assure its users ... had sufficient knowledge and skill to operate the moped; failed to ascertain previous experience in operating the moped", noting that the lessons offered by Revel were backlogged.

On August 9, 2019, a Revel rider was hit by a car from a rideshare company. Police say the rider ran a red light, while witnesses say the car was speeding as it passed through the intersection.

The first crash involving a Revel bike in Washington, D.C. occurred on August 18, 2019, the same weekend as their debut. A driver hit a pothole and fell off his moped which landed on top of him, breaking his collarbone. The company responded saying "Safety is our number one priority. This is why we verify riders have a safe driving history as part of our registration process, why we require all riders to use the helmets we provide on each Revel, and why we offer free lessons."

On August 31, 2019, two boys on a Revel in Washington, D.C. moped opened fire on an Uber car, leaving the driver with injuries from the shattered glass.

On July 18, 2020, CBS New York reporter Nina Kapur fell off a Revel moped and was killed in New York City. Less than two weeks later, on July 27, a 32-year-old man named Jeremy Malave was also killed in New York by a traumatic brain injury sustained from a Revel moped crash. Malave was wearing a helmet, but Kapur was not. Following their deaths, Revel suspended operations in New York for one month.

References

External links

Mopeds
Electric vehicle industry
Scooter sharing companies
Transportation companies based in New York City
2018 establishments in New York City
American companies established in 2018
Transport companies established in 2018